Frank Raymond Schuster (born May 20, 1971) is an American priest of the Catholic Church who serves as auxiliary bishop for the Archdiocese of Seattle.

Biography
Schuster graduated from the University of Washington in 1994, with a degree in psychology. On June 12, 1999, he was ordained to the priesthood.

Pope Francis appointed Schuster auxiliary bishop for the Archdiocese of Seattle on March 8, 2022.   On May 3, 2022, Schuster was consecrated as a bishop.

See also

 Catholic Church hierarchy
 Catholic Church in the United States
 Historical list of the Catholic bishops of the United States
 List of Catholic bishops of the United States
 Lists of patriarchs, archbishops, and bishops

References

External links
Roman Catholic Archdiocese of Seattle Official Site

Episcopal succession

 

1971 births
Living people
American Roman Catholic priests
Bishops appointed by Pope Francis